The Buffalo Bisons were a professional Triple-A minor league baseball team based in Buffalo, New York that was founded in 1886 and last played in the International League from 1912 to 1970. 

Over the course of their existence, the Bisons won the Junior World Series three times (1904, 1906 and 1961). They also won ten league championships, including the inaugural Governors' Cup in 1933. The 1927 Bisons were recognized as one of the 100 greatest minor league teams of all time. 

The team was last affiliated with the Montreal Expos of Major League Baseball and played its home games at War Memorial Stadium. The franchise moved to Winnipeg, Manitoba in the middle of the 1970 season to become the Winnipeg Whips.

History
 Organized baseball in Buffalo had existed since at least 1859, when the Niagara baseball club of the National Association of Base Ball Players played its first season. The first professional team to play in Buffalo began in 1877 as a member of the League Alliance; this team was invited to become a major league club, the Buffalo Bisons of the National League, and played from 1879 to 1885. In 1886, the Bisons moved into minor league baseball as members of the original International League, then known as the Eastern League. (An "outlaw" team also known as the Buffalo Bisons played in the Players' League, an upstart third major league, in 1890, but that team is not considered part of the Bisons history.) This team joined the Western League in 1899, and was within weeks of becoming a major league team when the Western League announced it was becoming a major league and changing its name to the American League in 1900. However, by the start of the 1901 season, Buffalo had been bumped from the league in favor of the Boston Americans; the Bisons returned to the minors and the Eastern League that year.

This franchise continued in the Eastern/International League through June 1970, when it transferred to Winnipeg, Manitoba as the Winnipeg Whips, due to poor attendance, stadium woes, the Montreal Expos affiliating with the franchise, and an increasingly saturated-Buffalo sports market that saw the Buffalo Sabres of the NHL and Buffalo Braves of the NBA established the same year. (The team had narrowly avoided relocation in 1955, but an idea of selling common stock in the team by John Stiglmeir prevented the team from leaving; it nonetheless was forced to move into a football venue, Buffalo War Memorial Stadium, a few years later, after its existing ballpark closed.) In 1969, Héctor López became the first black manager at the Triple-A level while managing Buffalo—six years before Frank Robinson became the first black manager in Major League Baseball. After stops in Winnipeg and Hampton, Virginia, the team was suspended after the 1973 season to make way for the Memphis Blues, who were moving up from Double-A only to move to Charleston as the re-born Charleston Charlies, before picking up stakes again to become the Maine Guides/Phillies. The team moved one more time in 1989, becoming the Scranton-Wilkes/Barre Red Barons - today, the RailRiders.

Robert E. Rich Jr. in 1979 launched the current Buffalo Bisons franchise, returning professional baseball to Buffalo.

National Baseball Hall of Fame members

References

Baseball teams established in 1886
Baseball teams disestablished in 1970
Cincinnati Reds minor league affiliates
Cleveland Guardians minor league affiliates
Defunct baseball teams in New York (state)
Defunct International League teams
Defunct minor league baseball teams
Detroit Tigers minor league affiliates
Kansas City Athletics minor league affiliates
Montreal Expos minor league affiliates
New York Mets minor league affiliates
Philadelphia Athletics minor league affiliates
Philadelphia Phillies minor league affiliates
Professional baseball teams in New York (state)
Sports clubs disestablished in 1970
Sports in Buffalo, New York
Washington Senators (1961–1971) minor league affiliates